Matthew James Morrison (born October 30, 1978) is an American actor, dancer, and singer, best known for his role as Will Schuester on the Fox television show Glee (2009–2015). 

He has starred in multiple Broadway and off-Broadway productions, including appearing as Link Larkin in the original Broadway cast of Hairspray (2002), Fabrizio Nacarelli in the original Broadway cast of the musical The Light in the Piazza (2005, for which he received a Tony Award nomination), and the starring role of J.M. Barrie in the original Broadway cast of Finding Neverland (2015-2016).

He starred as the Grinch in NBC's 2020 production Dr. Seuss' The Grinch Musical Live!. He has also been a judge on two reality dance competition shows on TV: The Greatest Dancer on BBC One, and So You Think You Can Dance on Fox.

Morrison signed with Adam Levine's 222 Records in 2012, and has released three solo albums: Matthew Morrison (2011), Where It All Began (2013), and Disney Dreamin' with Matthew Morrison (2020).

Early life
Morrison was born in Fort Ord, California, the son of Mary Louise (Fraser) and Thomas Morrison. Morrison was raised in Chico, California, and has Scottish and English ancestry. He was a member of Buena Park Youth theater, located in Buena Park. He was part of the Collaborative Arts Project 21 (CAP21) and the Orange County School of the Arts, while at the Los Alamitos High School campus. While in high school, Morrison did a musical with actress Jodie Sweetin. He attended New York University's Tisch School of the Arts for two years before dropping out and joining the Broadway adaptation of Footloose.

By freshman year of college, Morrison already was a regular performer on Broadway.

Career
In 1999, while still at NYU, Morrison appeared on Late Show with David Letterman and Total Request Live as one of five members of the fictional parody boy band "Fresh Step", an act that was conceived by several Late Show writers. The choreographer hired for "Fresh Step" was also the choreographer for the Broadway musical Footloose, and helped Morrison to get cast in Footloose later that year. Morrison dropped out of NYU to begin appearing in the show.

In 2001, Morrison was recruited to join the boy band LMNT, turning it from a trio into a quartet. He stayed in the band for one year, then left and was replaced by Jonas Persch; he left before the recording of the group's sole album, All Sides. In a 2010 interview, Morrison stated about the experience, "It was the worst year of my life. You know when you're a performer and you're out there on stage and you're embarrassed that you're doing something wrong. It was pretty bad."

Morrison briefly appeared in a revival of The Rocky Horror Show in 2002. He then starred in the original cast of the musical Hairspray as Link Larkin from its opening in 2002 through January 2004. In 2005, Morrison starred as Fabrizio Nacarelli in the Broadway premiere of Adam Guettel's musical The Light in the Piazza; he was nominated for a Tony Award for his performance. He left the show on August 28, 2005.

Morrison started working in television, guest-starring on shows such as Ghost Whisperer, Numbers, CSI: Miami and Hack. Morrison also had small roles in films including Marci X (2003). He also appeared as Sir Harry in the 2005 ABC-TV production of Once Upon a Mattress, starring Tracey Ullman, Zooey Deschanel and Carol Burnett.

Morrison joined the cast of the CBS soap opera As the World Turns as Adam Munson on October 24, 2006, but left abruptly soon after due to a "scheduling conflict", last airing on the soap on November 27. Morrison appeared in a benefit performance celebrating Andrew Lippa, and the 25th Anniversary of the performing troupe The Kids in the Hall at the Orange County Performing Arts Center in Costa Mesa, California in December 2006. The performance benefited The California Conservatory of the Arts, a non-profit arts education organization focusing on pre-professional training for young students, grades six through twelve, in Orange County, California.

He earned a Drama Desk Nomination for his role in the Off Broadway show 10 Million Miles which ran at the Atlantic Theater Company in 2007. That same year he appeared in two films: Dan in Real Life, followed by Music and Lyrics as Cora Corman's manager. In 2008, he played Lieutenant Cable in a Lincoln Center production of the musical South Pacific. He left the production at the end of 2008 and in early 2009 returned to California to shoot the first season of Glee.

Morrison played Will Schuester in the Fox Broadcasting television series Glee, which had its television preview on May 19, 2009. Schuester is a high school Spanish (later History) teacher who takes on the task of restoring the school's glee club to its former glory. He made his directorial debut with the third season's ninth episode.

In January 2010, Morrison signed a solo record deal with Mercury Records. His first studio album, Matthew Morrison, was released on May 10, 2011. Two singles were released from the album, "Summer Rain" and "Still Got Tonight". The album also includes duets with Elton John (a medley of "Mona Lisas and Mad Hatters" and "Rocket Man"),  Gwyneth Paltrow ("Over the Rainbow") and Sting ("Let Your Soul Be Your Pilot"). On June 16, 2010, Morrison joined Leona Lewis—appearing at London's O2 Arena as part of her world tour—for a one-off performance to sing "Over the Rainbow".

Morrison was on the cover of the June 2011 issue of MetroSource.

In March 2012, Morrison was featured in a performance of Dustin Lance Black's play, 8—a staged reenactment of the federal trial that overturned California's Prop 8 ban on same-sex marriage—as Paul Katami. The production was held at the Wilshire Ebell Theatre and broadcast on YouTube to raise money for the American Foundation for Equal Rights.

A Morrison concert at Connecticut's Bushnell Center was recorded and aired on PBS in June 2013. On April 28, 2013, Morrison made his first major appearance in the United Kingdom as a guest performer at the 2013 Laurence Olivier Awards at the Royal Opera House in London. On June 4, 2013, 222 Records released Morrison's second studio album, Where It All Began, an album of show tunes and jazz standards. One single was released from the album, a cover of "It Don't Mean a Thing".

Morrison returned to Broadway as J. M. Barrie in the Broadway debut of the musical Finding Neverland, which opened in April 2015.

On July 7, 2016, Morrison appeared alongside Megan Hilty in a summer evening of Broadway and other songs with The New York Pops at the Forest Hills Stadium in Forest Hills, Queens.

Morrison was a "dance captain" on BBC One's The Greatest Dancer, which aired for two seasons in 2019 and 2020, alongside Cheryl, Oti Mabuse and, in the second season, Todrick Hall as well. In the second half of 2019, he portrayed Trevor in the ninth season of the FX horror anthology television series American Horror Story.

In December 2020, he starred as The Grinch in NBC's production of Dr. Seuss' The Grinch Musical Live!.

On April 4, 2022, he was announced as a judge for the seventeenth season of So You Think You Can Dance, along with JoJo Siwa and Stephen "tWitch" Boss. However, on May 27, he was fired from the show for sending text messages to a female contestant that made her feel uncomfortable. His final episode aired on June 8, and he was replaced by actress Leah Remini. In an Instagram video posted in June 2022, Morrison claimed that his messages were just friendly and that he was a victim of cancel culture.

Personal life 
Morrison became engaged to actress Chrishell Stause on December 9, 2006. Their relationship later ended.

In 2011, Morrison began dating Renee Puente. On June 27, 2013, Elton John helped Morrison announce that he and Puente were engaged. Morrison and Puente were married on October 18, 2014, at a private home on the island of Maui. On May 16, 2017, it was revealed on his personal Instagram account that he and Puente were expecting their first child. Their son was born on October 22, 2017. On March 16, 2021, Morrison used his Instagram again to announce that he and Puente were expecting their second child together following a series of miscarriages. Their daughter was born on June 28, 2021.

Discography

Studio albums

EPs

Singles

Theatre

Filmography

Film

Television

Awards and nominations

References

External links

 
 
 
 
 
 
 

1978 births
Living people
20th-century American male actors
21st-century American male actors
21st-century American singers
222 Records artists
American jazz singers
American male dancers
American male film actors
American male jazz musicians
American male musical theatre actors
American male pop singers
American male singers
American male soap opera actors
American male television actors
American male voice actors
American people of English descent
American people of Scottish descent
American tenors
Jazz musicians from California
Male actors from Orange County, California
Mercury Records artists
Musicians from Orange County, California
Orange County School of the Arts alumni
Outstanding Performance by an Ensemble in a Comedy Series Screen Actors Guild Award winners
People from Fort Ord, California
Singers from California
Tisch School of the Arts alumni
Judges in American reality television series